Willard A. "Bill" Palmer (1917–1996) was an American musician, composer, and music educator, accomplished in the accordion and piano. He invented a 'quint' system which was later patented by Titano as used in their line of converter (or "quint") bass accordions.

Palmer made many written contributions to magazines for the promotion of the Piano accordion, including Accordion World. Some of the more important articles about his beliefs for improving the instrument and current style of playing have been gathered at The Classical Free-Reed, Inc. web site.

References

External links 
  operated by Palmer's sons

1917 births
1996 deaths
American accordionists
20th-century American pianists
20th-century accordionists
American male pianists
20th-century American male musicians